Taiwan Tongzhi Hotline Association (TTHA) is an organization that provides the LGBT community with peer counseling, support networks, and a community resource center. It is the first LGBT non-governmental organization (NGO) registered in Taiwan.

TTHA was established in 1998 as a joint effort of four groups  that focus on LGBT and gender issues, the Gay Counselors Association, Queer & Class, LGBT Civil Rights Alliance, and the Gay Teachers’ Alliance. The organization's current director-general is Yu Zhi-Yun (徐志雲).

Services and activities
TTHA's tasks focus on counseling, cultural events, and the protection of LGBT rights including:

 Counseling on gender identity
 Counseling for LGBT relationships
 Counseling on gay rights issues
 Providing LGBT-related resources
 Hosting counseling and support groups for parents of LGBT children
 Organizing and training volunteers
 Providing safe sex education and HIV-prevention education
 Hosting LGBT-inclusive workshops for teachers
 Organizing and assisting Taiwan Pride (2005)
 Promoting Gender Equity Education Act (2004)

As part of its work, TTHA has been supporting the promotion of gender equity education in Taiwan, notably through the inclusion of gay rights and sexual orientation topics in the new mandatory curriculum for elementary and junior high school. By teaching youths about diversity in sexual orientation, TTHA and other like-minded organizations hope to enhance understanding and respect. TTHA also ties this to efforts to stem bullying in schools, which is often based on prejudices and stereotypes towards gender or sexual orientation. However, inclusion of sexual orientation-related topics in school curriculum has met with opposition, and TTHA and other gender and gay rights advocacy groups recently have had to file a slander suit against a group stating that gender equity curriculum would promote "sexual openness" and same-sex marriage.

References

External links
Taiwan Tongzhi Hotline Association

1998 establishments in Taiwan
LGBT organizations in Taiwan
Organizations established in 1998